37th New York Film Critics Circle Awards
January 23, 1972

Best Picture: 
 A Clockwork Orange 
The 37th New York Film Critics Circle Awards honored the best filmmaking of 1971. The winners were announced on 29 December 1971 and the awards were given on 23 January 1972.

Winners
Best Actor:
Gene Hackman - The French Connection
Runners-up: Peter Finch - Sunday Bloody Sunday and Malcolm McDowell - A Clockwork Orange
Best Actress:
Jane Fonda - Klute
Runners-up: Gena Rowlands - Minnie and Moskowitz and Shirley MacLaine - Desperate Characters
Best Director:
Stanley Kubrick - A Clockwork Orange
Runners-up: Peter Bogdanovich - The Last Picture Show and Bernardo Bertolucci - The Conformist (Il conformista)
Best Film:
A Clockwork Orange
Runners-up: The Last Picture Show and The French Connection
Best Screenplay (tie):
Peter Bogdanovich and Larry McMurtry - The Last Picture Show
Penelope Gilliatt - Sunday Bloody Sunday
Runner-up: Éric Rohmer - Claire's Knee (Le genou de Claire)
Best Supporting Actor:
Ben Johnson - The Last Picture Show
Runners-up: Warren Oates - The Hired Hand and Two-Lane Blacktop and Alan Webb - King Lear
Best Supporting Actress:
Ellen Burstyn - The Last Picture Show
Runners-up: Cloris Leachman - The Last Picture Show and Ann-Margret - Carnal Knowledge

References

External links
1971 Awards

1971
New York Film Critics Circle Awards, 1971
New York Film Critics Circle Awards
New York Film Critics Circle Awards
New York Film Critics Circle Awards
New York Film Critics Circle Awards